Towns are settlements that are generally larger than villages but smaller than cities.

Towns may also refer to:

People 
 Charles B. Towns (1862–1947) American an expert on alcoholism and drug addiction
 Colin Towns (born 1948), English composer
 Darryl Towns (born 1961), American politician and member of New York State Legislature
 Edolphus Towns, (born 1934), American politician and a member of the U.S. House of Representatives from New York
 Forrest Towns (1914–1991), American track and field athlete and Olympic champion
 George W. Towns (1801–1854), American lawyer, legislator, and politician
 Greg Towns (born 1954), former Australian rules footballer 
 Karl-Anthony Towns (born 1995), Dominican–American basketball player
 Kevin Towns (born 1948), former men's field hockey player and coach of New Zealand
 Lester Towns (born 1977), former American football linebacker
 Marcy Towns, American chemist
 Morris Towns (born 1954), former American football offensive tackle
 Robert Towns (c. 1794–1873), Australian businessman, pastoralist, and founder of Townsville, Queensland
 Simon Towns (born 1972), New Zealand field hockey player
 Tom Towns (born 1953), former Canadian Football League linebacker
 William Towns (died 1994), British car designer

Places 
 Towns, Georgia, United States
 Towns County, Georgia, United States

Entertainment 
 Towns (video game)

See also 
 Towne
 Town (disambiguation)
 Townes (disambiguation)